e2fsprogs (sometimes called the e2fs programs)  is a set of utilities for maintaining the ext2, ext3 and ext4 file systems. Since those file systems are often the default for Linux distributions, it is commonly considered to be essential software.

List of utilities
Included with e2fsprogs, ordered by ASCIIbetical order, are:
badblocks  search a device for bad blocks
blkid  locate/print block device attributes
chattr  change file attributes on a Linux file system
debugfs  used to manually view or modify internal structures of the file system
dumpe2fs  which prints superblock and block group information.
e2freefrag  report free space fragmentation information
e2fsck  an fsck program that checks for and corrects inconsistencies
e2image  save critical ext2/ext3/ext4 filesystem metadata to a file
e2label  change the label on an ext2/ext3/ext4 filesystem
e2undo  replay an undo log for an ext2/ext3/ext4 filesystem
e4defrag  online defragmenter for ext4 filesystem
filefrag  report on file fragmentation
findfs  find a filesystem by label or UUID
findsuper  quick hacked up program to find ext2 superblocks
logsave  save the output of a command in a logfile
lsattr  list file attributes on a Linux second extended file system
mke2fs  used for creating ext2, ext3 and ext4 file systems
resize2fs  which can expand and shrink ext2, ext3 and ext4 file systems. On-line support was added in 2006.
tune2fs  used to modify file system parameters

Many of these utilities are based on the libext2fs library.

Usage
Despite what its name might suggest, e2fsprogs works not only with ext2, but also with ext3 and ext4. Although ext3's journaling capability can reduce the need to use e2fsck, it is sometimes still necessary to help protect against kernel bugs or bad hardware.

With ext4 the e2fsck runtime should come down considerably, as can be seen from the graph.

As the userspace companion for the ext2, ext3, and ext4 drivers in the Linux kernel, the e2fsprogs are most commonly used with Linux. However, they have been ported to other systems, such as FreeBSD and Darwin.

See also 

mkfs
dd — convert and copy a file
fdisk — examine and write partition table
fsck — file system check
mkisofs — make an iso file system
mount — mount a file system
parted — partition manager

References

External links
 
 e2fsprogs git repository
 Design and Implementation of the Second Extended Filesystem

Free software programmed in C
Linux file system-related software
Unix file system-related software